Pears are fruits produced and consumed around the world, growing on a tree and harvested in the Northern Hemisphere in late summer into October. The pear tree and shrub are a species of genus Pyrus , in the family Rosaceae, bearing the pomaceous fruit of the same name. Several species of pears are valued for their edible fruit and juices, while others are cultivated as trees.

The tree is medium-sized and native to coastal and mildly temperate regions of Europe, North Africa, and Asia. Pear wood is one of the preferred materials in the manufacture of high-quality woodwind instruments and furniture.

About 3,000 known varieties of pears are grown worldwide, which vary in both shape and taste. The fruit is consumed fresh, canned, as juice, dried, or fermented as perry.

Etymology 
The word pear is probably from Germanic pera as a loanword of Vulgar Latin pira, the plural of pirum, akin to Greek apios (from Mycenaean ápisos), of Semitic origin (pirâ), meaning "fruit". The adjective pyriform or piriform means pear-shaped. The classical Latin word for a pear tree is pirus; pyrus is an alternate form of this word sometimes used in medieval Latin.

Description 

Most pears are deciduous, but one or two species in Southeast Asia are evergreen.

The flowers are white, rarely tinted yellow or pink,  diameter, and have five petals.

The fruit is composed of the receptacle or upper end of the flower stalk (the so-called calyx tube) greatly dilated. Enclosed within its cellular flesh is the true fruit: five 'cartilaginous' carpels, known colloquially as the "core". From the upper rim of the receptacle are given off the five sepals, the five petals, and the very numerous stamens.

Pears and apples cannot always be distinguished by the form of the fruit; some pears look very much like some apples, e.g. the nashi pear. One major difference is that the flesh of pear fruit contains stone cells.

History 

Pear cultivation in cool, temperate climates extends to the remotest antiquity, and evidence exists of its use as a food since prehistoric times. Many traces have been found in prehistoric pile dwellings around Lake Zurich. Pears were cultivated in China as early as 2000 BC. An article on Pear tree cultivation in Spain is brought down in Ibn al-'Awwam's 12th-century agricultural work, Book on Agriculture.

The word pear, or its equivalent, occurs in all the Celtic languages, while in Slavic and other dialects, differing appellations, still referring to the same thing, are found—a diversity and multiplicity of nomenclature, which led Alphonse Pyramus de Candolle to infer a very ancient cultivation of the tree from the shores of the Caspian to those of the Atlantic.

The pear was also cultivated by the Romans, who ate the fruits raw or cooked, just like apples. Pliny's Natural History recommended stewing them with honey and noted three dozen varieties. The Roman cookbook De re coquinaria has a recipe for a spiced, stewed-pear patina, or soufflé. Romans also introduced the fruit to Britain.

A certain race of pears, with white down on the undersurface of their leaves, is supposed to have originated from P. nivalis, and their fruit is chiefly used in France in the manufacture of perry (see also cider). Other small-fruited pears, distinguished by their early ripening and apple-like fruit, may be referred to as P. cordata, a species found wild in western France and southwestern England.

The genus is thought to have originated in present-day Western China in the foothills of the Tian Shan, a mountain range of Central Asia, and to have spread to the north and south along mountain chains, evolving into a diverse group of over 20 widely recognized primary species.  The enormous number of varieties of the cultivated European pear (Pyrus communis subsp. communis), are without doubt derived from one or two wild subspecies (P. c. subsp. pyraster and P. c. subsp. caucasica), widely distributed throughout Europe, and sometimes forming part of the natural vegetation of the forests. Court accounts of Henry III of England record pears shipped from La Rochelle-Normande and presented to the king by the sheriffs of the City of London. The French names of pears grown in English medieval gardens suggest that their reputation, at the least, was French; a favoured variety in the accounts was named for Saint Rieul of Senlis, Bishop of Senlis in northern France.

Asian species with medium to large edible fruit include P. pyrifolia, P. ussuriensis, P. × bretschneideri, P. × sinkiangensis, and P. pashia.  Other small-fruited species are frequently used as rootstocks for the cultivated forms.

Major recognized species

Cultivation 

According to Pear Bureau Northwest, about 3000 known varieties of pears are grown worldwide.
The pear is normally propagated by grafting a selected variety onto a rootstock, which may be of a pear or quince variety.  Quince rootstocks produce smaller trees, which is often desirable in commercial orchards or domestic gardens. For new varieties the flowers can be cross-bred to preserve or combine desirable traits.  The fruit of the pear is produced on spurs, which appear on shoots more than one year old.

Three species account for the vast majority of edible fruit production, the European pear Pyrus communis subsp. communis cultivated mainly in Europe and North America, the Chinese white pear (bai li) Pyrus × bretschneideri, and the Nashi pear Pyrus pyrifolia (also known as Asian pear or apple pear), both grown mainly in eastern Asia. There are thousands of cultivars of these three species.  A species grown in western China, P. sinkiangensis, and P. pashia, grown in southern China and south Asia, are also produced to a lesser degree.

Other species are used as rootstocks for European and Asian pears and as ornamental trees. Pear wood is close-grained and at least in the past was used as a specialized timber for fine furniture and making the blocks for woodcuts.  The Manchurian or Ussurian Pear, Pyrus ussuriensis (which produces unpalatable fruit) has been crossed with Pyrus communis to breed hardier pear cultivars. The Bradford pear (Pyrus calleryana 'Bradford') in particular has become widespread in North America, and is used only as an ornamental tree, as well as a blight-resistant rootstock for Pyrus communis fruit orchards. The Willow-leaved pear (Pyrus salicifolia) is grown for its attractive, slender, densely silvery-hairy leaves.

Cultivars

The following cultivars have gained the Royal Horticultural Society's Award of Garden Merit:

 'Beth'
 ’Beurré Hardy’
 ’Beurré Superfin’
 'Concorde'
 'Conference'
 ’Doyenné du Comice’
 'Joséphine de Malines'

The purely decorative cultivar P. salicifolia ‘Pendula’, with pendulous branches and silvery leaves, has also won the award.

Harvest 
Summer and autumn cultivars of Pyrus communis, being climacteric fruits, are gathered before they are fully ripe, while they are still green, but snap off when lifted.  In the case of the 'Passe Crassane', long the favored winter pear in France,  the crop is traditionally gathered at three different times: the first a fortnight or more before it is ripe, the second a week or ten days after that, and the third when fully ripe. The first gathering will come into eating last, and thus the season of the fruit may be considerably prolonged.

Diseases and pests

Production 

In 2020, world production of pears was 23.1 million tonnes, led by China with 69% of the total (table). About 48% of the Southern Hemisphere's pears are produced in the Patagonian valley of Río Negro in Argentina.

Storage 

Pears may be stored at room temperature until ripe. Pears are ripe when the flesh around the stem gives to gentle pressure. Ripe pears are optimally stored refrigerated, uncovered in a single layer, where they have a shelf life of 2 to 3 days.

Pears ripen at room temperature. Ripening is accelerated by the gas ethylene.  If pears are placed next to bananas in a fruit bowl, the ethylene emitted by the banana causes the pears to ripen.  Refrigeration will slow further ripening.  According to Pear Bureau Northwest, most varieties show little color change as they ripen (though the skin on Bartlett pears changes from green to yellow as they ripen).

Uses

Cooking

Pears are consumed fresh, canned, as juice, and dried. The juice can also be used in jellies and jams, usually in combination with other fruits, including berries. Fermented pear juice is called perry or pear cider and is made in a way that is similar to how cider is made from apples. Perry can be distilled to produce an eau de vie de poire, a colorless, unsweetened fruit brandy.

Pear purée is used to manufacture snack foods such as Fruit by the Foot and Fruit Roll-Ups.

The culinary or cooking pear is green but dry and hard, and only edible after several hours of cooking. Two Dutch cultivars are "" (a sweet variety) and "" (slightly sour).

Timber
Pear wood is one of the preferred materials in the manufacture of high-quality woodwind instruments and furniture, and was used for making the carved blocks for woodcuts. It is also used for wood carving, and as a firewood to produce aromatic smoke for smoking meat or tobacco. Pear wood is valued for kitchen spoons, scoops and stirrers, as it does not contaminate food with color, flavor or smell, and resists warping and splintering despite repeated soaking and drying cycles. Lincoln describes it as "a fairly tough, very stable wood... (used for) carving... brushbacks, umbrella handles, measuring instruments such as set squares and T-squares... recorders... violin and guitar fingerboards and piano keys... decorative veneering." Pearwood is the favored wood for architect's rulers because it does not warp.  It is similar to the wood of its relative, the apple tree (Malus domestica) and used for many of the same purposes.

Nutrition 

Raw pear is 84% water, 15% carbohydrates and contains negligible protein and fat (table). In a  reference amount, raw pear supplies  of food energy, a moderate amount of dietary fiber, and no other essential nutrients in significant amounts (table).

Comparison

Research
Preliminary research is investigating whether there is a correlation between apple/pear consumption and improved cardiovascular health.

Cultural references 
Pears grow in the sublime orchard of Alcinous, in the Odyssey vii: "Therein grow trees, tall and luxuriant, pears and pomegranates and apple-trees with their bright fruit, and sweet figs, and luxuriant olives. Of these the fruit perishes not nor fails in winter or in summer, but lasts throughout the year."

"A Partridge in a Pear Tree" is the first gift in the cumulative song "The Twelve Days of Christmas".

The pear tree was an object of particular veneration (as was the walnut) in the tree worship of the Nakh peoples of the North Caucasus – see Vainakh mythology and see also Ingushetia – the best-known of the Vainakh peoples today being the Chechens of Chechnya. Pear and walnut trees were held to be the sacred abodes of beneficent spirits in pre-Islamic Chechen religion and, for this reason, it was forbidden to fell them.

Gallery

See also 
 List of culinary fruits
 List of Lepidoptera that feed on pear trees
 List of pear cultivars

References

Further reading

External links 

 
 
Crops originating from Europe
Flora of Asia
Flora of Europe
Flora of North Africa
Fruits originating in Africa

Fruit trees